Neargyractis is a genus of moths of the family Crambidae.

Species
Neargyractis alemundalis (Schaus, 1924)
Neargyractis caesoalis (Walker, 1859)
Neargyractis fulvicinctalis (Hampson, 1897)
Neargyractis holocycla (Meyrick, 1936)
Neargyractis moniligeralis (Lederer, 1863)
Neargyractis plusialis (Herrich-Schäffer, 1871)
Neargyractis serapionalis (Schaus, 1924)
Neargyractis slossonalis Dyar, 1906

References

 , 1956: A generic revision of the aquatic moths of North America: (Lepidoptera: Pyralidae, Nymphulinae). Wasman Journal of Biology, San Francisco 14  (1): 59–144. Full article: .

External links
Natural History Museum Lepidoptera genus database

Acentropinae
Crambidae genera